George Grabham may refer to:

 George Wallington Grabham (1836–1912), New Zealand doctor and health administrator
 George Walter Grabham (1882–1955), British geologist